The Kings of Corco Modhruadh reigned over an area that was coextensive with the diocese of Kilfenora.

In the 12th-century, the kingdom split into Corco Modhruadh Iartharach ("Western Corcomroe") and Corco Modhruadh Oirthearach ("Eastern Corcomroe") also known as Boireann. These districts were ruled by the Ó Conchubhair Corcomroe and Ó Lochlainn families, respectively.

In the 16th-century these areas became the English administrative baronies of Corcomroe and Burren.

List of kings (incomplete)

For further references, see Annals of Inisfallen

 Torpaid, died 769.
 Flaithbertach mac Dub Ruip, died 873.
 Cet mac Flaithbertach, 907-919
 Aniudán mac Mael Gorm, died 936.
 Conchobar mac Mael Sechnaill, fl. 993, died 1003. 
 Cathal mac Conchobur, died 1015
 Lochlainn, died 1015.
 Conchobar mac Mael Sechnaill, died 1027.
 Congalach Ua Lochlainn, died 1045.
 Anad Ua Lochlainn, killed 1060.
 Conchobar Ua Chonchobuir, died 1104

External links
 http://www.ucc.ie/celt/published/T100004/index.html

Lists of Irish monarchs